Freedom is a 1985 bronze sculpture by Alfred Tibor, installed in Columbus, Ohio's Battelle Riverfront Park, in the United States.

Description and history
The abstract sculpture, dedicated on July 4, 1985, depicts a walking figure setting a bird free. It measures approximately 15 x 6 x 5 ft., and rests on a base that measures approximately 48 x 53 x 72 in. A plaque on the base reads: 

The artwork was surveyed by the Smithsonian Institution's "Save Outdoor Sculpture!" program in 1994.

References

1985 establishments in Ohio
1985 sculptures
Abstract sculptures in the United States
Sculptures of birds in the United States
Bronze sculptures in Ohio
Outdoor sculptures in Columbus, Ohio
Statues in Columbus, Ohio